The Silver King may refer to:

 The Silver King (play), an 1882 play by Henry Herman and Henry Arthur Jones 
 The Silver King (1919 film), a 1919 American film adaptation of the play
 The Silver King (1929 film), a 1929 British film adaptation of the play

See also
 Silver King (disambiguation)